John William Gosling (1921 – 1994 ) was a Fijian cricketer. A right arm medium pace bowler, he played one first-class match for the Fiji national cricket team, against Canterbury in March 1948. Eight years later, he was a key part of the Fijian team that gained an upset 28 run win over the Test-playing West Indians, taking six wickets, including that of Garfield Sobers.

References

1921 births
1994 deaths
Fijian cricketers
Sportspeople from Suva